Halo is an unincorporated community in Webster County, West Virginia, United States.

References

Unincorporated communities in West Virginia
Unincorporated communities in Webster County, West Virginia